Teemu Mikael Tainio (born 27 November 1979) is a Finnish football coach and former player. He is the current head coach of FC Haka.

Tainio began his career with his local club, TP-47, before moving to FC Haka in 1996. A year later, he moved to France to play for Auxerre. After eight years there, he joined English club Tottenham Hotspur, where he spent three years before joining Sunderland. After a loan spell with Birmingham City during the 2009–10 season, he moved to Dutch club Ajax, before joining the New York Red Bulls in 2011. After two seasons in the United States, he returned to Finland to finish his career with HJK.

He mostly played in a variety of midfield positions during his career, and also at right-back under Juande Ramos at Tottenham.

Club career

Early life and career
Tainio was born in Tornio. He was promoted to the first team of his hometown club TP-47 in Kakkonen, Finland's third tier, at the age of fourteen. He was signed by Veikkausliiga club FC Haka for the 1996 season. Following a trial at Manchester United in March 1997, Tainio joined French club AJ Auxerre in 1997, and spent eight years at the club. He won the Coupe de France with Auxerre twice, and also gained UEFA Champions League experience. While with Auxerre, Tainio appeared in 204 official matches and scored 19 goals.

Tottenham Hotspur
With Tainio's contract with Auxerre due to expire in 2005, he became available on a free transfer. In January 2005, it was announced that he would move to Tottenham Hotspur on a seven-year deal in the summer of 2005. He became a regular for Spurs in his first season, playing in various midfield positions.

He scored his first goal for his new club in December 2005 against Newcastle United during a Premiership match at White Hart Lane. Tainio was one of ten Spurs squad members struck down by a virus on the evening of 6 May 2006 before their crucial final game of the season against West Ham. He nevertheless played in the match, which Spurs lost, missing out on a place in the Champions League.

He scored his second Spurs goal on 9 December 2006, the third goal in the 5–1 home win against Charlton Athletic. His third goal for the club was an equaliser against West Ham United to make the score 2–2 on 4 March 2007. Spurs went on to win the game 4–3.

Tainio won the 2008 League Cup when Tottenham took a 2–1 extra-time win over Chelsea at Wembley Stadium in the final played on 24 February 2008. He came on as a substitute in the 75th minute when the score was 1–1. He then was booked with five more minutes left in the game for time wasting on a throw in.

Sunderland

He joined Sunderland on 23 July 2008 for an undisclosed fee. He became their first summer signing and the first Finnish player ever for Sunderland.
He scored his first goal for Sunderland in a second round League Cup game at Norwich on 24 August 2009. He left Sunderland on 31 August 2010, when the club terminated his contract by mutual consent.

Tainio joined Birmingham City on 1 September 2009, on loan for the remainder of the 2009–10 season. Having recovered from a calf injury sustained on international duty, he made his debut for the club on 13 September in a 1–0 home defeat in the Birmingham derby against Aston Villa, in which he produced a good performance in a less-familiar role at right-back.

Ajax
Tainio signed a one-year contract with AFC Ajax on the very same day after he was released by Sunderland. At Ajax, he rejoined his former Tottenham coach, Martin Jol. He made his Ajax debut on 11 September 2010, playing the last five minutes as a substitute for Demy de Zeeuw in a 2–0 victory over Willem II. He also made appearance in the 2010–11 Champions League, playing the last 21 minutes against Real Madrid in the 2–0 away loss match in the group stage. After making only five official appearances while with Ajax, Tainio accepted an offer from Major League Soccer side New York Red Bulls.

New York Red Bulls
Tainio joined New York Red Bulls during their pre-season training for the 2011 Major League Soccer season. He became the first Finn to sign for the team formerly known as the New York/New Jersey Metrostars when the club officially signed him on 9 March 2011. He made his official debut for New York on 19 March 2011, in the Red Bulls' 2011 MLS season opener, a 1–0 victory over Seattle Sounders FC, assisting on Juan Agudelo's game-winning goal. He has quickly become a fan favorite early in the season with multiple assists and good play to his name. On 15 November 2012, Tainio, along with teammates Jan Gunnar Solli, Bill Gaudette, and José Angulo were all denied contract extensions, thus ending their tenure at New York.

HJK Helsinki
On 2 January 2013, it was announced that the 33-year-old Tainio had signed a two-year contract with the reigning Finnish champions, HJK Helsinki. On 19 June 2013, he scored his first goal for HJK, in a 4−2 away win over MYPA. This was his first goal since 24 August 2009.
On 14 February 2015, Tainio announced his retirement as a player.

International career

Tainio made his debut for the Finland national team on 5 February 1998 against Cyprus, and was a regular for the team through most of the 2000s. After signing with New York Red Bulls in 2011, Tainio announced that he might retire at the international level, citing the long-distance flights and time difference between the States and Finland. After a two-year hiatus, Tainio made his comeback to the international team, immediately after his contract with the Red Bulls expired.

Managerial career
On 1 November 2018, Tainio was appointed as manager of Ykkönen side FC Haka, having previously worked as an assistant coach for the side. In his first season as manager, FC Haka overwhelmingly won the Ykkönen title, earning the club promotion to top tier Veikkausliiga.

Career statistics

Scores and results list Finland's goal tally first, score column indicates score after each Tainio goal.

Honours

As a player
FC Haka
Finnish Cup: 1997

Auxerre
Coupe de France: 2004–05

Tottenham Hotspur
Football League Cup: 2007–08

Ajax
Eredivisie: 2010–11

HJK
Veikkausliiga: 2013, 2014
Finnish Cup: 2014

As a manager
FC Haka
Ykkönen: 2019

References

External links

 

1979 births
Living people
People from Tornio
Association football midfielders
Finnish footballers
Finland international footballers
Finnish expatriate footballers
Expatriate footballers in France
Expatriate footballers in England
Expatriate footballers in the Netherlands
Expatriate soccer players in the United States
Finnish expatriate sportspeople in France
Finnish expatriate sportspeople in England
Finnish expatriate sportspeople in the Netherlands
FC Haka players
AJ Auxerre players
Tottenham Hotspur F.C. players
Sunderland A.F.C. players
Birmingham City F.C. players
AFC Ajax players
New York Red Bulls players
Veikkausliiga players
Ligue 1 players
Premier League players
Eredivisie players
Major League Soccer players
Finnish expatriate sportspeople in the United States
TP-47 players
Finnish football managers
FC Haka managers
Sportspeople from Lapland (Finland)